Nyassachromis is a genus of haplochromine cichlids endemic to Lake Malawi. They are open-water mouthbrooders, an ecological niche known as utaka to locals.

Species
There are currently eight recognized species in this genus:
 Nyassachromis boadzulu (Iles, 1960)
 Nyassachromis breviceps (Regan, 1922)
 Nyassachromis leuciscus (Regan, 1922) (Small Green Utaka)
 Nyassachromis microcephalus (Trewavas, 1935)
 Nyassachromis nigritaeniatus (Trewavas, 1935)
 Nyassachromis prostoma (Trewavas, 1935)
 Nyassachromis purpurans (Trewavas, 1935)
 Nyassachromis serenus (Trewavas, 1935)

References

 
Haplochromini

Cichlid genera
Taxa named by Ethelwynn Trewavas
Taxonomy articles created by Polbot